A psychological adaptation is a functional, cognitive or behavioral trait that benefits an organism in its environment. Psychological adaptations fall under the scope of evolved psychological mechanisms (EPMs), however, EPMs refer to a less restricted set. Psychological adaptations include only the functional traits that increase the fitness of an organism, while EPMs refer to any psychological mechanism that developed through the processes of evolution. These additional EPMs are the by-product traits of a species’ evolutionary development (see spandrels), as well as the vestigial traits that no longer benefit the species’ fitness. It can be difficult to tell whether a trait is vestigial or not, so some literature is more lenient and refers to vestigial traits as adaptations, even though they may no longer have adaptive functionality. For example, xenophobic attitudes and behaviors, some have claimed, appear to have certain EPM influences relating to disease aversion, however, in many environments these behaviors will have a detrimental effect on a person's fitness.  The principles of psychological adaptation rely on Darwin's theory of evolution and are important to the fields of evolutionary psychology, biology, and cognitive science.

Darwinian theory 

Charles Darwin proposed his theory of evolution in On the Origin of Species (1859). His theory dictates that adaptations are traits that arise from the selective pressures a species faces in its environment. Adaptations must benefit either an organism's chance of survival or reproduction to be considered adaptive, and are then passed down to the next generation through this process of natural selection. Psychological adaptations are those adaptive traits that we consider cognitive or behavioral. These can include conscious social strategies, subconscious emotional responses (guilt, fear, etc.), or the most innate instincts. Evolutionary psychologists consider a number of factors in what determines a psychological adaptation, such as functionality, complexity, efficiency, and universality. The Adapted Mind is considered a foundational text on evolutionary psychology, further integrating Darwinian theory into modern psychology.

Evolved adaptation vs learned behaviour
An area of disagreement arises between evolutionary psychologists, cognitive scientists and behaviourists on where to draw the line on what is considered a psychological adaptation, and what is considered a learned behaviour. Where behaviourism explains certain behaviours as conditioned responses, cognitivism may push that these behaviours arise from a psychological adaptation that institutes a preference for that behaviour. Evolutionary psychology proposes that the human psychology consists primarily of psychological adaptations, which is opposed by the tabula rasa or blank slate model of human psychology. Early behaviourists, like B.F. Skinner, tended to the blank slate model and argued that innate behaviors and instincts were few, some behaviourists suggesting that the only innate behavior was the ability to learn. On the other hand, Steven Pinker presents the cognitivist perspective in his book, The Blank Slate, in which he challenges the tabula rasa models and argues that human behaviour is shaped by psychological adaptations.

This difference in theory can be seen in research on modern human sexual preferences, with behaviourists arguing that attraction has conditioning influences, such as from the media or cultural norms, while others arguing it is based on psychological adaptations. However, sexual preferences are a difficult subject to test due to the amount of variance and flexibility exhibited in human mate choice. A hybrid resolution to psychological adaptations and learned behaviours refers to an adaptation as the species’ capacity for a certain behavior, while each individual organism still needs to be conditioned to exhibit that behaviour. This approach can explain language acquisition in relation to linguist and cognitive scientist Noam Chomsky's model of human language. His model supports that the capacity for language is a psychological adaptation (involving both the language necessary brain structures and disposition for language acquisition), however, children lack any particular instantiation of language at birth, and must instead learn one in their environment.

Sexual selection 
The mating strategies of both sexes can be simplified into different psychological adaptations. There is extensive evidence that incest avoidance, which is the tendency to avoid sexual intercourse with close relatives is an evolved behavioural adaptation. Incest avoidance can be seen cross-culturally in humans, and is evident in wild animals. Evolutionary psychologists argue that incest avoidance adapted due to the greater chance of producing children with severe disabilities when mating with relatives, and because genetic variability offers an increase in fitness regarding offspring survival. Sexual jealousy is another behavior observed in human and non-human animals that appears to be instinctual. Heuristic problem solving and consistent preference for behavioral patterns are considered by some evolutionary psychologists to be psychological adaptations. For example, the tendency for females to change their sexual strategies when faced with developmental pressures such as an absent father may be the result of a psychological adaptation.

Psychological adaptation in males 

Human males have developed psychological adaptations, which make them attractive to the opposite sex in order to increase their reproductive success. Evolutionarily, it pays for a male to be polygynous – to have a number of female partners at once – because it means he can create more offspring at once, as they don't have to invest any time in carrying a foetus. Examples of some of these other adaptations include strategies to entice females, strategies to retain a partner and the desire for short-term relationships.

Humour 
It has been researched that humour is sexually selected and acts as a fitness indicator. According to this research it was concluded the production of humour increases mate value in men, and some women seek men with a good sense of humour. In turn, some men are believed to have developed an adaptation in which they endeavour to produce humour with the aim to attract female mates.

Waist-to-hip ratio 
Human males have developed an adaptation in which they find women more attractive if they show cues of fertility, such as a good waist–hip ratio. Women with a waist-to-hip ratio of 0.7 are considered more attractive to males than those with a ratio of 0.8, who are considered to have a more masculine figure. This is because they are perceived to be able to have children more and to be more fertile and healthy.

Mate retention 
Males have developed behaviours that help them to retain a mate, also known as mate guarding, in order to enhance reproductive success in long-term relationships. Examples are intersexual manipulations which involves the male manipulating the way his partner views their current relationship and to repulse her from other relationships. He could do this by enhancing his own value or decreasing the value of other males. In extreme cases, some men have developed intersexual adaptations that restrict their partner from interacting with other men, including the use of violence. By doing this, women may be less able to leave that relationship, even if it is due to fear. On the other hand, intrasexual manipulations are used to reduce any other options for the women, which could include decreasing their partner's value or make it clear to other males that a woman is 'theirs' by using possessive techniques such as holding her hand in public.

Parental investment 
With regards to parental investment, males are much more wary when investing in offspring as they cannot guarantee that the child is theirs. Therefore, as an adaptation, males tend to only invest in offspring if there are high levels of commitment and if they were produced in a long-term relationship as opposed to short-term relationships.

Short-term mating 
Some human males have also developed an adaptation in which they have a desire for short-term relationships more than some human females do. This is because men hardly have any investment obligation, whereas a female has to carry a child for nine months if she was to fall pregnant after the sexual encounter. Evolutionarily, it is thought that males have a desire to reproduce as much as they can, and short-term relationships are a good way to inseminate many women with his sperm in order for his genes to continue through generations. There is much evidence for how this short-term mating has evolved psychologically for males, beginning with the desire for a variety of sex partners. It seems that a larger percentage of men, in every culture of the world, desire more than one sex partner in one month compared to women. Furthermore, men are more likely than women to have sexual intercourse with someone having known them for only one hour, one day, one week or one month.

Problems 
However, there are some adaptive problems in short-term mating that men must solve; one of these is avoiding commitment and women who might not have sex with the male until they have a signal of commitment or investment. This would reduce the number of partners a male could pursue and succeed with.

Psychological adaptation in females 

Female sex-specific adaptations provide evidence of special design for the purpose of increasing fitness and in turn, reproductive success.  For example, mate choice, rape aversion tactics and pregnancy sickness are all female-specific psychological adaptations, identified through empirical research, found to increase genetic contributions through survival and reproduction.

Mate-choice as an adaptation 

A psychological adaptation for the purpose of reproductive success can be seen in female mate choice. David Buss, an evolutionary psychologist, examines the fundamental principles of selection pressures that create human mate preferences in his contribution to the publication The Adapted Mind.  Females have evolved psychological procedures that affect mating decisions in relation to certain male physical attributes and behaviours.  Robert Trivers, an evolutionary biologist, outlines the evolutionary basis of these preferences in relation to parental investment and sexual selection.  He proposes that females have adapted a preference to mate with males who display both an ability and willingness to invest vital resources for the survival of the female and her offspring. Research suggests females are able to use external cues displayed by males such as territory or physical possessions.

For example, women are able to evaluate the long-term presence of testosterone in men by observing facial testosterone cues.  Testosterone stimulates craniofacial development and results in a squarer jaw and consequently, a more masculine appearance. Women in the fertile phase of their menstrual cycle perceive masculine faces as healthier and more attractive than feminine male faces.  Females show a psychological adaptation to detect mate quality using these hormonal cues which display the male's fitness and reproductive value. Males who display testosterone cues show a female that they are able to offset the high physiological costs such as immunosuppressant effects.

Rape avoidance 

Research proposes that women have evolved psychological mechanisms specifically designed to motivate rape-avoidance behaviours or strategies.  This is because rape poses severe costs for the female such as pregnancy, physical harm, injury or death, relationship abandonment and self-esteem depletion.  The greatest cost to the female is the circumvention of her mate choice, which threatens reproductive success, resulting in the possession of adaptations in response.  
Evidence suggests that a number of female-specific traits have evolved in order to reduce the risks associated with experiencing rape. The body-guard hypothesis  proposes that rape-avoidance drives women's mate preferences for physically strong or dominant males. Women may also form groups with men and women as a protective alliance against potential rapists.  Psychological pain experienced following rape is also identified as an adaptive process designed to focus the female on the social circumstances surrounding the rape for future prevention.

Evidence for this as an adaptation can be seen in reproductive-aged women who are found to experience more psychological pain following rape due to an increased risk of conception.  Research also suggests that women in the fertile phase of their menstrual cycle perform fewer risky behaviours that could potentially result in the risk of rape.  Women's capacity to resist rape also changes relative to their menstrual cycle; females in the fertile phase show an increase in handgrip strength when placed in a threatening, sexually coercive scenario. Susceptibility to signs of a male's coerciveness is also identified to be better in fertile women.

Pregnancy sickness 

One psychological adaptation found solely in women is pregnancy sickness.  This is an adaptation resulting from natural selection for the purpose of avoiding toxic-containing foods during pregnancy. Margaret Profet, an evolutionary biologist, provides evidence for this adaptation in a literature review on pregnancy sickness. Particular plant foods, whilst unharmful to adults, can contain toxins (e.g. teratogens) that are dangerous for developing embryos and can potentially cause birth defects such as facial asymmetry. Evidence lies in the finding that women who experience more extreme cases of pregnancy sickness tend to be less likely to miscarry or have babies with birth defects. This fits the criteria for an adaptation as it enhances fitness and increases reproductive success – it results in greater fertility of the mother and contributes to the health of the developing embryo.

Researchers dispute whether this is actually a psychological adaptation, however evidence advocates it is the result of strong selective pressures in our hereditary past. For example, the toxins are found only in natural wild plant foods, not processed foods in our modern-day environment. Furthermore, pregnant women experiencing sickness have been found to avoid particular bitter or pungent smelling foods, potentially containing toxins. Pregnancy induced sickness only typically occurs 3 weeks after conception, around the time when the embryo has started forming major organs and is therefore at the highest risk. It is also a cross-cultural universal adaptation, a suggestion it is an innate mechanism.

See also

 Adaptive behavior (ecology)
 Adaptive bias
 Cognitive module
 Dual inheritance theory
 Evolutionary developmental psychology
 Evolutionary psychology
 Human behavioral ecology
 Instinct
 Modularity of mind

References

External links

Evolutionary psychology